Tenema N'Diaye (born 13 February 1981) is a Malian former professional footballer who played as a striker.

Club career
N'Diaye was born in Bamako. In August 2010, he joined FC Metz.

References

External links
 
 
 

1981 births
Living people
Sportspeople from Bamako
Malian footballers
Association football forwards
Mali international footballers
Mali under-20 international footballers
2010 Africa Cup of Nations players
Ligue 2 players
Championnat National players
Tunisian Ligue Professionnelle 1 players
Cypriot First Division players
UAE Pro League players
Djoliba AC players
Stade Tunisien players
CS Sfaxien players
Hong Kong Rangers FC players
Dubai CSC players
Al Wahda FC players
Grenoble Foot 38 players
Tours FC players
FC Nantes players
FC Metz players
Kavala F.C. players
Nea Salamis Famagusta FC players
Footballers at the 2004 Summer Olympics
Olympic footballers of Mali
Malian expatriate footballers
Malian expatriate sportspeople in Tunisia
Expatriate footballers in Tunisia
Expatriate footballers in France
Expatriate footballers in Greece
Expatriate footballers in Cyprus
Expatriate footballers in the United Arab Emirates
21st-century Malian people